2 is the second studio album by Danish Pop duo Nik & Jay.

Track listing

Commercial reception

The album topped the Danish Albums Chart in the first week of 2005 and stayed in the charts for a total of 71 weeks. Five singles were released from the album: "Pop-pop!", "En dag tilbage", "Lækker" "Kan du høre hende synge" and "Strip".

Certifications

References

2004 albums
Nik & Jay albums
Danish-language albums
Nexus Music albums